EC Pfaffenhofen, founded 1970, is a German professional ice hockey team based in Pfaffenhofen an der Ilm that plays in the Bayernliga.

References

External links 
Official homepage

Ice hockey teams in Germany
Ice hockey teams in Bavaria
Sport in Upper Bavaria
1970 establishments in West Germany
Ice hockey clubs established in 1970
Pfaffenhofen (district)